Schwartziella cancapae is a species of minute sea snail, a marine gastropod mollusk or micromollusk in the family Zebinidae.

The species was named after the CANCAP expeditions in which this species was discovered.

Description
The height of the shell attains 4 mm (0.16 in).

Distribution
This species occurs in the Atlantic Ocean off the Cape Verdes.

References

 Rolán E., 2005. Malacological Fauna From The Cape Verde Archipelago. Part 1, Polyplacophora and Gastropoda.

cancapae
Gastropods described in 2000
Gastropods of Cape Verde